John Fadrique (died 1366) was a son of Alfonso Fadrique, vicar general of Athens and Neopatras, and Marulla of Verona. He is attested as lord of Aegina and Salamis in 1350.

References

Sources
  

14th-century people from the Kingdom of Aragon
John
People from the Duchy of Athens
Year of birth unknown
Year of death unknown
John